Paolo Galluzzi (born 1942, Florence, Italy) is an Italian historian of science.

Biography
He has been director of the Museo Galileo – Istituto e Museo di Storia della Scienza in Florence, Italy since 1982.
He held the chair of History of Science at the University of Siena from 1979 to 1994, then at the University of Florence from 1994 to 2010. He was editor-in-chief of Nuncius, an international journal for the history of science, from 1991 until 2007. He presently sits on the scientific boards of important journals and cultural institutions in Italy and abroad. He was assigned chairman of the International Scientific Committee by the Nobel Foundation to create the Nobel Museum in Stockholm. He currently chairs the Advisory Boards of the National Edition of Leonardo da Vinci’s Manuscripts and Drawings and of the Updates to the National Edition of Galileo Galilei’s Work. He is a member of the Royal Swedish Academy of Sciences, the American Philosophical Society and the Accademia Nazionale dei Lincei.
His research is focused on the following topics: Leonardo da Vinci, Renaissance scientists and engineers, Galileo and his School, European scientific academies, history of scientific instruments, museums and scientific collecting, historiography of science, and the history of scientific research in post-Unification Italy. He has also developed many plans for research organization and dissemination of scientific culture.
He conceived a number of historical scientific exhibitions which have been displayed in Italy and abroad, as well as information systems and multimedia on the history of science and technology.

Works
He is the author of many works on the topics dealt with in his research. Among the most recently published books: Tra atomi e indivisibili. La materia ambigua di Galileo, Firenze, Olschki, 2011, and «Libertà di filosofare in naturalibus». I mondi paralleli di Cesi e Galileo, Roma, Accademia Nazionale dei Lincei, 2014, .
He was director of the Storia della Scienza published by Einaudi and of the “Biblioteca della Scienza Italiana” series. He also edited the catalogues of the exhibitions he conceived.

Footnotes

See also
 Museo Galileo
 Galileo Galilei
 Leonardo da Vinci
 Accademia Nazionale dei Lincei

External links
 Museo Galileo - Istituto e Museo di Storia della Scienza (Florence, Italy)

Historians of science
Living people
1942 births
Museo Galileo
Members of the American Philosophical Society